Casket most often refers to:
 Coffin, a box used for the display of corpses at wakes and funerals and for interment
 Chasse (casket), a decorated container typically from medieval Europe having a shape that resembles a house

Casket may also refer to:
 Casket (solitaire), a card game
 The Casket, a weekly newspaper published in Antigonish, Nova Scotia, Canada

See also
List of caskets